Leslie Coombs DeVall Jr. (May 2, 1919 – August 27, 2008) was an American football player and coach.

He played college football at the University of Southern Mississippi in 1940 and 1941 as a blocking back.

DeVall began his coaching career as the head football coach at Hinds Community College in Raymond, Mississippi and served as the head coach at William Carey University during the only two years (1954 and 1955) that the school offered football. He also served as William Carey's baseball coach for one season.  DeVall was the head football coach at Louisiana College in Alexandria, Louisiana for one season before serving in the same role for nine seasons at McNeese State University.

DeVall died away in 2008.

Head coaching record

College football

References

1919 births
2008 deaths
American football quarterbacks
Louisiana Christian Wildcats football coaches
McNeese Cowboys football coaches
Southern Miss Golden Eagles football players
William Carey Crusaders baseball coaches
William Carey Crusaders football coaches
Junior college football coaches in the United States
People from Ellisville, Mississippi
Players of American football from Mississippi